ElizaBeth Ann Gilligan (August 16, 1962 – October 9, 2017) was an American fantasy author who lived in San Francisco, California.

Biography
Gilligan was born in [Ft. Benning, GA] and was raised and lived in the San Francisco Bay Area. She studied journalism at Kent State University.

Gilligan published articles, essays and poetry. Her short story Iron Joan was a preliminary ballot nominee for the 2002 Nebula Award in the category of Best Short Story. Gilligan served as the secretary for the Science Fiction Writers of America (SFWA) board of directors from 2002 to 2003, and she frequently attended OryCon and BayCon.

Gilligan died from cancer on October 9, 2017, aged 55, in her sleep at her home in Newark, California. She was survived by her husband, Douglas Archer Gilligan, two children, and two grandchildren.

Bibliography

Short works
Taking Back the Night (1994)		
Demon Calling (2000)	
Iron Joan (2002, published in Black Gate: Adventures in Fantasy Literature)
Chasing Time (2003)		
Brownie Points (2004)		
Off Key (2004)
Tete-tete (2015)

Novels
Magic's Silken Snare (2003, Daw Books)
The Silken Shroud (2004, DAW Books)
Sovereign Silk (2017, DAW Books)

Anthologies
Gilligan's works have appeared in the following anthologies.
Witch Fantastic (1994, Daw Books)
Sword And Sorceress XVII (2000, Daw Books)
The Sorcerer's Academy (2003, Daw Books)
Little Red Riding Hood in the Big Bad City (2004, Daw Books)
The Magic Shop (2004, Daw Books)
First Contact Cafe (2015, SkyWarrior Publications)

Sources:

Anthologies edited by Gilligan.
Alterna-Teas (2017, Createspace Independent Publishing Platform,

References

1962 births
2017 deaths
21st-century American novelists
21st-century American short story writers
21st-century American women writers
American fantasy writers
American women short story writers
American women novelists
Women science fiction and fantasy writers
Writers from San Francisco
People from the San Francisco Bay Area
Deaths from cancer in California